The scarce bridle snake (Lycodon gracilis)  is a species of snake found in South India, Sri Lanka, and Myanmar.

Description
The holotype measures  in length, including the  tail. The holotype has 234 ventral scales, an entire anal scale, and 81–83 subcaudal scales. The ground colour is white. There are about 38 dark-brown crossbands, which are about 2–3 times as wide as the white interspaces. The interspaces are marbled with brown. The first crossband occupies the head. The lower parts are uniform white.

Distribution
This species is known from scattered records, including just two specimens reported since 1888. In India, it is known from Andhra Pradesh, Karnataka, and Orissa. The Sri Lankan record is from Jaffna. Lastly, this species is known from False Island, off the Arakan coast of Myanmar. The holotype was collected from the Anamallay Mountains by Richard Henry Beddome.

Habitat
Lycodon gracilis occurs in moist and dry forests. Its Sri Lankan habitat has been described as "monsoon scrub jungle".

Threats
This species could be threatened by habitat loss and degradation caused by agricultural and urban expansion. However, the impact of these threats is unknown as current records are lacking.

References

External links
 https://web.archive.org/web/20051229232916/http://www.strangeark.com/ebooks/IndiaHerps.pdf

Lycodon
Snakes of Asia
Reptiles of India
Reptiles of Myanmar
Reptiles of Sri Lanka
Taxa named by Albert Günther
Reptiles described in 1864